, also stylized as Chie Satou, is a Japanese voice actress who has been featured in a number of anime shows. She is most known for portraying various characters on a number of Pokémon television shows and as Bo-chan in Crayon Shin-chan.

Roles
* Bolded names indicate a major role in the work

Anime (film)
 Seigi Choujin vs. Ancient Choujin (1985) - Preschooler C
 Dragon Ball Z: Bardock – The Father of Goku (1990) - Saiya-jin C
 Crayon Shin-chan: Action Kamen vs Leotard Devil (1993) - Bo-chan
 Crayon Shin-chan: The Secret Treasure of Buri Buri Kingdom (1994) - Bo-chan
 Dr. Slump and Arale-chan: Hoyoyo!! Follow the Rescued Shark... (1994) - Unlisted
 Crayon Shin-chan: Unkokusai's Ambition (1995) - Bo-chan
 Marmalade Boy (1995) - Gastman Omega
 Crayon Shin-chan: Adventure in Henderland (1996) - Bo-chan
 Crayon Shin-chan: Pursuit of the Balls of Darkness (1997) - Bo-chan
 Crayon Shin-chan: Blitzkrieg! Pig's Hoof's Secret Mission (1998) - Bo-chan
 Crayon Shin-chan: Explosion! The Hot Spring's Feel Good Final Battle/Kureshin Paradise! Made in Saitama (1999) - Bo-chan
 Crayon Shin-chan: The Storm Called The Jungle (2000) - Bo-chan
 Crayon Shin-chan: The Storm Called: The Adult Empire Strikes Back (2001) - Bo-chan
 Crayon Shin-chan: The Storm Called: The Battle of the Warring States (2002) - Bo-chan
 Crayon Shin-chan: The Storm Called: Yakiniku Road of Honor (2003) - Bo-chan
 Odoru Pokémon Himitsu Kichi (2003) - Habuneku
 Crayon Shin-chan: The Storm Called: The Kasukabe Boys of the Evening Sun (2004) - Bo-chan
 Crayon Shin-chan: The Legend Called Buri Buri 3 Minutes Charge (2005) - Bo-chan
 Pocket Monsters Advanced Generation the Movie - Mew and the Wave Hero: Lucario (2005) - Haruka's Gonbe (May's Munchlax); Beroringa (Lickitung)
 Crayon Shin-chan: The Legend Called: Dance! Amigo! (2006) - Bo-chan
 Pocket Monsters Advanced Generation the Movie - Pokémon Ranger and the Prince of the Sea: Manaphy (2006) - Haruka's Gonbe (May's Munchlax)
 Crayon Shin-chan: The Storm Called: The Singing Buttocks Bomb (2007) - Bo-chan
 Crayon Shin-chan: The Storm Called: The Hero of Kinpoko (2008) - Bo-chan
 Pocket Monsters Diamond & Pearl the Movie - Giratina and the Sky's Bouquet: Shaymin (2008) - Ogin; Hikari's Etebosu (Dawn's Ambipom)
 Crayon Shin-chan: Roar! Kasukabe Animal Kingdom (2009) - Bo-chan

Anime (OAV)
 Mobile Suit Gundam 0080: War in the Pocket (1989) - Reception
 Roujin Z (1991) - Nobuko Ohe
 Fight!! Spirit of the Sword (1993) - Young Yonosuke

Anime (TV show)
GeGeGe no Kitaro Series 3 (1985) - Unlisted
High School! Kimengumi (1985) - Toiyo Matsumo
Saint Seiya (1986) - Young Hyouga (ep 21); Young Nachi
Bikkuriman (1987) - Alibaba Shintei
Kiteretsu Daihyakka (1988) - Konchi (2nd Voice); Otonashi (1st Voice)
Dragon Quest (1989) - Young Abel
Himitsu no Akko-chan: Umi da! Obake da!! Natsu Matsuri (1989) - Goma
Transformers: Victory (1989) - Sam (ep 6)
My Daddy Long Legs (1990) - Sally McBride
Mashin Hero Wataru 2 (1990) - Niboshi Obaasan
Getter Robo Go (1991) - Daifou Tetsu
Moero! Top Striker (1991) - Makaroni
Zettai Muteki Raijin-Oh (1991) - Tokie Sakai; Yoshiaki Ogawa
Floral Magician Mary Bell (1992) - Bongo
Mikan Enikki (1992) - Taichi
Pretty Soldier Sailor Moon (1992) - Hosenka (ep 24)
Shin-chan (1992) - Bo-chan
Nintama Rantarō (1993) - Isuke
Little Women II: Jo's Boys (1993) - Stuffy
Pig Girl of Love and Courage: Tonde Burin (1994) - Masami Yamakawa (4 episodes)
Marmalade Boy (1994) - Uchiyama
Captain Tsubasa J (1994) - Ryo Ishizaki (young)
Metal Fighter Miku (1994) - Amazoness (ep 6); Mad Kong (ep 1)
Huckleberry Finn Monogatari (1994) - Jim
Bonobono (1995) - Ki no Obake
GeGeGe no Kitaro Series 4 (1996) - Unlisted
Remi, Nobody's Girl (1996) - Joli-Coeur
Kaiketsu Zorro (1996) - Casas
Master Keaton (1998) - Little Connelly (ep 13)
Yu-Gi-Oh! (1998) - Childhood Kaiba (ep 20)
Pocket Monsters Advanced Generation (2002) - Haruka's Gonbe (May's Munchlax); Musashi's Habunake (Jessie's Seviper); Yasue Kachinuki (ep 46)
Pocket Monsters Side Stories (2002) - Masae (ep 14)
Tsuribaka Nisshi (2002) - Sasaki's Wife
Baby Baachan (2004) - Yone-san
Melody of Oblivion (2004) - Monokeros #4
Ragnarok the Animation (2004) - Maria
Pocket Monsters Diamond and Pearl (2006) - Haruka's Gonbe (May's Munchlax); Hikari's Eteboth (Dawn's Ambipom); Musashi's Habunake (Jessie's Seviper); Shinji's Yamikarasu (Paul's Murkrow)
GeGeGe no Kitaro Series 5 (2007) - Junpei (ep 10); Tatsumi Ioyama (ep 29)
Hatara Kizzu Maihamu Gumi (2007) - Large God house housekeeping lady (ep 3)
Mokke (2007) - Hiyoshi's aunt (ep 4)
Oh! Edo Rocket (2007) - Rokube's wife
To Love-Ru (2008) - Gi Buri's wife (ep 6)
Yōkai Watch (2014) - Kanchi

Dubbing
Painted Faces, Child Yuen Biao

References

External links
 
 Chie Satō at Aoni Production

1964 births
Living people
Japanese voice actresses
Voice actresses from Saitama (city)
Aoni Production voice actors